Walter D. Egan (1866 – December 24, 1913) was a member of the Wisconsin State Assembly.

Biography
Egan was born in Chicago, Illinois in 1866. Later, he married Margaret Carr. He died in Superior, Wisconsin on December 24, 1913.

Career
Egan was elected to the Assembly in 1908. He was a Republican.

References

Politicians from Chicago
Republican Party members of the Wisconsin State Assembly
1866 births
1913 deaths
19th-century American politicians